Amrit Singh (born ) is an Indian male  track cyclist. He competed in the team sprint event at the 2012 and 2013 UCI Track Cycling World Championships.

References

External links
 Profile at cyclingarchives.com

1991 births
Living people
Indian track cyclists
Indian male cyclists
Place of birth missing (living people)
Cyclists at the 2010 Asian Games
Cyclists at the 2010 Commonwealth Games
Cyclists at the 2014 Asian Games
Cyclists at the 2006 Commonwealth Games
Commonwealth Games competitors for India
Asian Games competitors for India